Life Flows On (Crematorium) is a 2016 Indian English-language drama film directed by Vishaal Nityanand. The film has Indian and European cast and crew, produced by Vishaal Nityanand Films, Vikas Batra and Sanjeev Saroha. It's a film dedicated to Global Dementia Challenge and Elderly care, deals with the lives of three dementia patients. The film had its world premiere at ‘Jagran Film Festival’ on 1 October ( International Day of Older Persons ) 2016. It has been released in India on 21 October 2016, with Carnival Cinemas.

Cast
 Tom Alter as Tom
 Dr. Satyabrat Rout as Dr. Arora
 Allegra Dunn as Emma
 Astri Ghosh as Catherine
 Ganjendra Verma as Wandering man
 Sudarshan Juyal –Col. Thapa 
 Vishaal Nityanand as Ajay
 Shweta Bhatt as Ragini
 Michael Dieter as David

Music

The songs were composed by Pete Wildman, Alok Malasi. The album received a positive response from critics.

Reception
Life flows on  received critical acclaim from the media [ Urban Asian | date = 21 September 2016, The Hindu | date = 22 October 2016, Garhwal Post | date = 21 September 2015, Nav Hind Times | date = 14 October 2017, News Nation  | date = 16 October 2016 and community [ Organisations and community working on Alzheimer's/Dementia, Alzheimer's Speak Radio (Lori ) | date =5 August 2017, Patient Engage | date= 28 April 2017  ] concerned with Global Dementia Challenge, without any publicity. Jugneeta Sudan (The Navhind Times) wrote:" the film evocatively portrays the psychological and emotional journey of Emma (Allegra Dunn) whose mother (Astri Ghosh) is progressively degenerating, with the onset of Alzheimer’s disease".

Recently | date 12 September 2017, Oslo Norway film has started its international tour from Bollywood film Festival.

See also
 International Day of Older Persons

References

External links

2016 films
 Landour(mussoorie)
2010s English-language films